Pablo Lucio Vasquez (August 11, 1977  April 6, 2016) was an American man convicted of the murder of a 12-year-old boy and executed in the U.S. state of Texas. The murder occurred in Donna, Texas, in the state's Rio Grande Valley region.

Due to the way he murdered his victim, Vasquez was called "the vampire killer".

Background 
David Cardenas, the victim, was a 12-year-old boy who lived in his sister's residence in Alamo, Texas.

Murder 
On April 18, 1998,  Vasquez went to a party in Donna, Texas, with his 15-year-old cousin, Andres Rafael "Andy" Chapa (born February 7, 1983). During the party he became intoxicated with cocaine and alcohol. At the party he met Cardenas, and while walking from the party to a house, Vasquez hit Cardenas on the head with a pipe and cut the boy's throat. He and Chapa took the body to a field, across a four-lane street, leaving a trail of blood. At the field Vasquez robbed the body of valuables, cut off one arm, severed a portion of another arm, removed skin from Cardenas's back, scalped the body, and drank his blood, before placing the body under pieces of aluminum. Vasquez tried to sever the boy's head with a shovel, but failed. Three relatives of Vasquez and Chapa had attempted to conceal the crime.

Aftermath 
Vasquez was arrested in Conroe, Texas, after an anonymous tip. When questioned by police he said that the devil told him to remove Cardenas's head.

Vasquez's trial began in 1999, and his lawyer was James Keegan; Joseph Orendain was the lead prosecutor. Vasquez was convicted and given a death sentence. Chapa received a 35-year sentence after pleading guilty. The relatives who assisted the perpetrators received fines and/or probation, and one was deported back to Guatemala.

Vasquez was received by the Texas Department of Criminal Justice (TDCJ) on March 30, 1999. Initially the men's death row was at Ellis Unit, north of Huntsville, Texas, but in mid-1999 it moved to Polunsky Unit near Livingston, Texas.

Vasquez's lawyer unsuccessfully argued that he should not be executed as he was mentally ill.

Vasquez apologized to the victim's family before he was executed by lethal injection at Huntsville Unit in Huntsville, Texas on April 6, 2016.  At the time of his execution, Vasquez was 38 years old, having spent 18 years on Texas's death row.

The execution marked the sixth in Texas and the eleventh in the United States in 2016.

See also 
 Capital punishment in Texas
 List of people executed in Texas, 2010–2019
 List of people executed in the United States in 2016

References

External links 
 Pablo Lucio Vasquez - Taped Confession with Police Investigators (29 minutes)
 

1977 births
2016 deaths
American male criminals
American people convicted of murder
People convicted of murder by Texas
Executed people from Texas
People executed by Texas by lethal injection
Place of birth missing
1998 murders in the United States
American murderers of children
People from Dawson County, Texas
21st-century executions by Texas
21st-century executions of American people
Vampirism (crime)
People executed for murder